Bathtubs Over Broadway is a 2018 American documentary film directed by Dava Whisenant. Comedy writer Steve Young’s assignment to scour bargain-bin vinyl for a late-night segment becomes an unexpected, decades-spanning obsession when he stumbles upon the strange and hilarious world of industrial musicals. The film premiered at the 2018 Tribeca Film Festival and was released on November 30, 2018 by Focus World.

Synopsis 
Steve Young is a comedy writer working for the Late Show with David Letterman. In 1993, his assignment to scour comedy vinyl records for a late-night segment leads him to an industrial musical produced by General Electric. Over the next two decades, Steve collects rare and unreleased recordings of industrial musicals, traveling across the country to meet and trade with other record collectors. Steve also tracks down the surviving composers and stars of many musical productions in order to map out the timespan of what he considers to be the strangest entertainment industry in America, from its rise in the 1950s to its eventual decline by the late-1980s.

Credits 

 David Letterman
 Martin Short
 Chita Rivera
 Susan Stroman
 Florence Henderson
 Sheldon Harnick
 Jello Biafra
 Steve Young
 Don Bolles
 Melody Rogers
 Willi Burke
 Peter Shawn
 Sandi Freeman
 Patt Stanton Gjonola
 Hank Beebe
 Sid Siegel

Reception 
Bathtubs Over Broadway has received acclaim from critics and audiences on the festival circuit, earning multiple awards. The film was included in Robert DeNiro's top 6 picks for the 2018 Tribeca Film Festival.

Festival Premiere 
Bathtubs Over Broadway premiered on April 21, 2018 at the BMCC Tribeca Performing Arts Center as part of the 2018 Tribeca Film Festival. The film's director, Dava Whisenant, won Tribeca's Albert Maysles Award for Best New Documentary Director. Tribeca Jury: “The winner of the Best New Documentary Director goes to a film that we chose for many reasons. The story, the specific subject, the journey into a world we never knew existed. This film also has an element every great film, doc, and story needs...heart.”Described as "the most feel-good film event of the 2018 Tribeca Film Festival," the premiere featured post-screening live performances, including a duet about motion-activated faucets that reunited the stars of American Standard's cult favorite industrial show The Bathrooms Are Coming!

Accolades

Music

Soundtrack 
The digital version of the soundtrack for Bathtubs Over Broadway was released by Back Lot Music on August 16, 2019. It was produced by Ozzy Inguanzo and Dava Whisenant, and features a collection of "rare, original cast recordings from the golden age of industrial musicals, as depicted throughout the film. Many of these vintage tracks have never been made commercially available and have been restored from their original vinyl recordings." Among the now-famous Broadway talent included on the album are Fiddler on the Roof songwriters and Tony Award winners Sheldon Harnick and Jerry Bock as well as Tony Award-winning actor Hal Linden. The soundtrack also includes an original score by Anthony DiLorenzo as well as original songs with lyrics by Steve Young, the main subject of the film. A vinyl configuration of the soundtrack is planned for a Fall 2019 release.

References

External links 

2018 documentary films
American documentary films
Blumhouse Productions films
Documentary films about business
Documentary films about theatre
Films about musical theatre
Focus Features films
Back Lot Music soundtracks
2010s English-language films
2010s American films